John James Carson (9 March 1870 - 17 August 1903) was a rugby union player who represented Australia.

Biography
Carson, a prop, was born in Grahamstown, New Zealand and claimed one international rugby cap for Australia. His sole game was against Great Britain, at Sydney, on 24 June 1899, the inaugural rugby Test match played by an Australian national representative side. Zavos describes Carson as a "formidable front-rower" and quotes a contemporary commentator "the best all-round forward in Australia....in the pack, in the loose and on the lineout, he is equally good." Zavos cites the highest praises as being an acknowledgement by "New Zealanders" that he was as good as any forward in that country.

Carson died from tuberculosis in 1903.

Sources
 Collection (1995) Gordon Bray presents The Spirit of Rugby, Harper Collins Publishers Sydney
 Howell, Max (2005) Born to Lead - Wallaby Test Captains, Celebrity Books, Auckland NZ

References

Australian rugby union players
Australia international rugby union players
1870 births
1903 deaths
Rugby union props